Alfred Donald Playfair (1871-1943) was a rugby league footballer in the New South Wales Rugby League's inaugural season of 1908.

Alfred was a member of the Sydney side Eastern Suburbs - one of only two surviving foundation clubs.

During his life he was vice president of the Royal Agricultural Society.

He is listed as the Sydney Roosters 21st ever player.

References

 The Eastern Suburbs club website

Australian rugby league players
Sydney Roosters players
1871 births
1943 deaths
Place of birth missing